Cipocereus bradei is a species of cactus. It is endemic to the state of Minas Gerais in Brazil. It is threatened by habitat loss.

References

External links

Endemic flora of Brazil
Cactoideae
Vulnerable plants